Alfredo Adolfo Fioravanti (1886–1963) was an Italian sculptor, who was part of the team that forged the Etruscan terracotta warriors in the Metropolitan Museum of Art.

References
Authenticity in Art: The Scientific Detection of Forgery by Stuart James Fleming 

1886 births
1963 deaths
Place of birth missing
20th-century Italian sculptors
20th-century Italian male artists
Italian male sculptors
Art forgers